Arthur William Stokes (16 May 1868 – 1960) was an English professional footballer who played in the Football League for Aston Villa, Burton Swifts and Walsall Town Swifts.

References

1872 births
1960 deaths
English footballers
Association football defenders
English Football League players
Wednesbury Old Athletic F.C. players
Walsall F.C. players
Aston Villa F.C. players
Burton Swifts F.C. players
Loughborough F.C. players